Joseph Henry Kuhns (September 1800November 16, 1883) was a Whig member of the U.S. House of Representatives from Pennsylvania.

Biography
Joseph H. Kuhns born near Greensburg, Pennsylvania.  He graduated from Washington College (later Washington & Jefferson College) in Washington, Pennsylvania, in 1820.  He studied law, was admitted to the bar in 1823 and commenced practice in Greensburg.

Kuhns was elected as a Whig to the Thirty-second Congress.  He was an unsuccessful candidate for reelection in 1852.  He resumed the practice of law in Greensburg and died there in 1883.  Interment in St. Clair Cemetery.

Sources

The Political Graveyard

1800 births
1883 deaths
Washington & Jefferson College alumni
Pennsylvania lawyers
Whig Party members of the United States House of Representatives from Pennsylvania
19th-century American politicians
19th-century American lawyers